Let's Go Luna! is an educational animated children's television series created by Joe Murray for PBS Kids. Murray formerly worked on the Nickelodeon animated series Rocko's Modern Life and Cartoon Network animated series Camp Lazlo. It is co-produced by 9 Story Media Group. Judy Greer provides the voice of the titular Luna. In the first season, there are 38 half-hour episodes and a one-hour special. The second season has 26 episodes and premiered on May 10, 2021. Each episode consists of two 11-minute story segments, with a short segment of one of the characters telling a folktale, song or poem from that country in between.

Unlike Rocko's Modern Life and Camp Lazlo which are both sitcoms, Let's Go Luna! marks the first educational series and the first preschool-focused series created by Joe Murray. The series  concluded the total of 68 episodes through November 18, 2022.

Premise
Let's Go Luna! sets in a world populated by anthropomorphic animals, focuses on three kids—Leo, a wombat from Sydney, Australia, Andy, a frog from the United States and Carmen, a butterfly from Mexico City, Mexico—who travel around the world with their parents' traveling performance troupe "Circo Fabuloso". Two half-hour episodes, consisting of two segments each and four in total, take place in a single country where the gang stop at, learn about and meet friends around the world. With a team of cultural anthropologists on board, Let's Go Luna! is "meticulously researched to ensure cities and regions are authentically and respectfully portrayed."

Characters

Main
 Luna (voiced by Judy Greer; singing voices by Judy Greer (2018–19), Erin Fitzgerald (2019-20), and Liane de Lotbinère (2020) is Earth's Moon herself, who guides Leo, Andy, and Carmen on their trips during the daytime. Luna knows every person in the world and has magical capabilities. Her size gives her a problem with doorways and enclosed spaces, often involving a degree of uncomfortable squeezing to enter. She also has an uncontrollable urge to dance when she hears happy music.
 Leo Chockers (voiced by Aidan Wojtak-Hissong (2018) and Shayle Simons (2018-22) is a wombat who loves food. He is learning to become a cook like his father. 
 Andy Hopper (voiced by Jaiden Cannatelli (2018–20) and Evan O'Donnell (2020–22) is a frog who loves art.
 Carmen Mariposa (voiced by Saara Chaudry) is a butterfly who loves music. She plays a Spanish guitar that was handed down from her deceased grandmother and speaks with a Mexican accent.
 Magic Globe (voiced by Miku Graham) is a miniature globe of the world that lives in Carmen's pocket and can share information about the places that the children visit.

Recurring
 Señor Moncarlo Fabuloso (voiced by Paul Braunstein) is a flamingo and the ringmaster of the Circo Fabuloso. He speaks with a Spanish accent.
 Mr. Hockbar (voiced by David Berni) is a vole who does many of the 'behind the scenes' jobs such as selling tickets, setting up the Circo's schedule and making certain everything runs smoothly. He is full of energy and has a tendency to get worked up and rush around when many things need doing, which can stress out the other members of the Circo. His full name is revealed to be Hock Thelonious Bar.
 Honey (voiced by Zoe Hatz) is Carmen's mischievous yellow pet hamster. She often escapes from her cage, but it is only because she is curious and wishes to be included.
 Maria Mariposa (voiced by Tamara Almeida) is Carmen's single mother, and the conductor of the Circo Fabuloso Band.
 Wolfgang and Pippa Chockers (voiced by Paul Braunstein and Linda Ballantyne) are Leo's parents who work at the Circo. Wolfgang is the Circo's chef (who loves Dad jokes) and Pippa is the Circo's carpenter.
 Mathilda Chockers is Leo's destructive baby sister.
 Wrinkles is Leo's pet tortoise.
 Lucie Hopper (voiced by Carolyn Scott) is Andy's mother, and the Circo's costume designer.
 Sam Hopper (voiced by Dan Chameroy) is Andy's father and the Circo's prop-maker.
 Bonjour and Au Revoir (voiced by Peter Cugno) are twin brothers who work as clowns. Bonjour's mask is purple and Au Revoir's is green. They both speak with French accents.
 Ingrid Svenson-Benson (voiced by Brigitte Solem) is a centipede and the Circo's contortionist. She speaks with a Swedish accent.
 Salami Strong (voiced by Paul Braunstein) is an alligator and the Circo's strongman. He speaks with an Italian accent.
 Pablo (voiced by Cory Doran) is an armadillo who performs with the Melvinis, a group of six living bowling pins.
 The Acronauts are a trio of acorn-shaped bears who perform as acrobats.
 The Fearless Shrews (voiced by David Berni) are a trio of shrews who perform as trapeze artists. They speak with Peruvian accents.
 Wally is a gray walrus wearing brown pants, a red shirt, and a battered brown hat, with a camera around his neck. The character often appears as a tourist, as he makes an appearance as a background character in every story, usually taking photographs and infrequently has a speaking role.

Episodes

Series overview

Season 1 (2018–20)

Season 2 (2021–22)

Let's Go Luna!: Luna's Christmas Around the World 
A TV special named Let's Go Luna!: Christmas Around the World aired on December 10, 2018. Here, the Circo gets stuck in Antarctica after their captain gets wasted on fruit cake.

Production and distribution
The show was first announced on July 31, 2017, as part of the PBS TCA presentation. PBS broadcasts the show on its stations and also airs on the 24-hour PBS Kids channel, as well as the PBS Kids video app. Let's Go Luna! offers digital content for kids, parents and teachers, debuting from its PBS Kids website and a Luna app was also confirmed and would have been released shortly after the series' debut. However, the app ceased development and is on the PBS Kids video and games apps. There was going to be an Elinor Wonders Why app too, but the same thing happened and that series has been on the PBS Kids video and games apps as well. 9 Story International Distribution owns managing and merchandising rights to the show outside Canada. It is also one of a few shows for preschoolers and PBS' first storyboard-driven show where storyboard artists work with the writers, in order to create "visually-driven narratives that highlight each city's distinctive landscape and features." It was originally going to be titled Luna Around the World but was changed to Let's Go Luna!.

International broadcast
The show airs on Nat Geo Kids in Latin America. In Spain, the show airs on Canal Panda. In Italy, it airs on Rai Yoyo. In Canada, the show airs on TVOKids. In Turkey, the show will air on TRT Çocuk. In the half-hour broadcast of Let's Go Luna! on TVOKids, the short segment that occurs between the two 11-minute story segments of the show is kept in the broadcast instead of being removed.

Home video
Five episodes were released on DVD on February 11, 2020. Episodes were also released on PBS Kids compilation DVDs in 2020.

Reception

Critical response
The Washington Post wrote that the program is "Teaching tolerance, kindness and friendship."

Awards and nominations

Merchandise
On May 18, 2022, Mighty Mojo released plush toys of the main characters throughout its show.

References

External links

 Official website
 

2010s American animated television series
2010s Canadian animated television series
2018 American television series debuts
2022 American television series endings
2018 Canadian television series debuts
2022 Canadian television series endings
2020s American animated television series
2020s Canadian animated television series
American children's animated education television series
Canadian children's animated education television series
American children's animated comedy television series
Canadian children's animated comedy television series
English-language television shows
PBS Kids shows
PBS original programming
Animated television series about children
Animated television series about frogs
Animated television series about insects
Fictional butterflies and moths
Fictional wombats
Television series about the Moon
Television series by 9 Story Media Group
Television series by Brown Bag Films
Television series created by Joe Murray